The 2017–18 Central Michigan Chippewas men's basketball team represented Central Michigan University during the 2017–18 NCAA Division I men's basketball season. The Chippewas, led by sixth-year head coach Keno Davis, played their home games at McGuirk Arena as members of the West Division of the Mid-American Conference. They finished the season 21–14, 7–11 in MAC play to finish in fifth place in the West Division. They defeated Bowling Green in the first round of the MAC tournament before losing in the quarterfinals to Buffalo. They were invited to the CollegeInsider.com Tournament where they defeated Fort Wayne and Wofford to advance to the quarterfinals where they lost to Liberty.

Previous season
The Chippewas finished the 2016–17 season 16–16, 6–12 in MAC play to finish in last place in the West Division. As the No. 11 seed in the MAC tournament, they lost in the first round to Kent State.

Offseason

Recruiting class of 2017

Recruiting class of 2018

Schedule and results

|-
!colspan=9 style=| Exhibition

|-
!colspan=9 style=| Non-conference regular season

|-
!colspan=9 style=| MAC regular season

|-
!colspan=9 style=| MAC tournament

|-
!colspan=9 style=| CIT

See also
 2017–18 Central Michigan Chippewas women's basketball team
The March 3 game against Western Michigan was originally scheduled for March 2, but was rescheduled for the next day and relocated to Northwood University due to the Central Michigan shooting. As a result, this game was closed off to the public.

References

Central Michigan
Central Michigan Chippewas men's basketball seasons
Central Michigan